Megan Ellyia Green (born July 25, 1983) is an American politician and educator from St. Louis, Missouri. She has served as the President of the St. Louis Board of Aldermen since 2022, having previously been the alderwoman from the 15th ward since 2014. Green is a progressive Democrat and a member of the Democratic Socialists of America.

Originally from Upstate New York, Green moved to St. Louis in 2005 to participate in the Coro Fellows Program in Public Affairs. She has a political science degree from Penn State and a PhD in education policy from Saint Louis University. Green is an adjunct instructor at the George Warren Brown School of Social Work at Washington University in St. Louis, teaching public policy.

In November 2022, Green won the special election to succeed former Board President Lewis Reed, who resigned after being indicted on federal bribery charges. The first woman to serve as President of the Board, Green is running unopposed for a full four-year term in 2023.

Before politics
Green was born in Oneonta, New York. Her father is a philosophy professor at SUNY Oneonta and her mother is a public school English teacher.

After college, Green taught middle school at St. Louis Public Schools. She later served in the non-profit sector, including the homeless women's shelter Shalom House, the Lemay Child & Family Center, and Childcare Aware of Missouri.

St. Louis Board of Aldermen

First term and bribery allegations
Green was first elected to the Board of Aldermen on October 7, 2014, winning a special election in the 15th ward, which covers Tower Grove South and parts of Tower Grove East. Running as an independent, she received 46% of the vote and defeated three other candidates. Green had been endorsed by Board President Lewis E. Reed. She was sworn in on October 17, 2014. The special election had been called after the previous alderwoman, Jennifer Florida, resigned to become the city's Recorder of Deeds.

After defeating a Democratic opponent in the March 2015 primary election, Green was re-elected to the Board of Aldermen in April with nearly 89% of the vote.

Green alleged in 2015 that a "loved one" had been offered a political bribe in return for Green "dialing down" her opposition to a proposed football stadium. She went on to criticize the Board of Aldermen's "quid pro quo mentality" and said that "the deal cutting, bribery... at City Hall will never cease to amaze me." Green later apologized to Alderman Sam Moore after implying that he had accepted bribes in exchange for his vote on the planned stadium. St. Louis Public Radio reported that Green's allegations "seemed to irritate" her fellow board members and an investigation by the St. Louis Metropolitan Police Department and the FBI determined that her claims had "no substance."

Reed radio show comments and second term
Board President Lewis Reed faced backlash in 2016 after appearing on a radio show hosted by Bob Romanik. In an episode aired on January 11, 2016, Romanik referred to Green as "skanky bitch" and "alderbitch" while Reed laughed and called Green "reprehensible." Reed later apologized for his "nervous laughter" and called Romanik's comments "out of line."

In March 2017, Green was challenged by her predecessor, Jennifer Florida, in the aldermanic Democratic primary. During the campaign, Florida was charged with third-degree assault against a man in St. Louis County. Green defeated Florida 66-34% and won the general unopposed.

In a September 2017 incident, Green and several others were tear-gassed by the St. Louis Metropolitan Police Department in the Central West End while protesting police brutality. Green sued the city and its police department in 2018, alleging retaliation and excessive use of force.

Flip the Board campaign and final term
In the 2021 city elections, Green led the "Flip the Board" effort, encouraging progressive candidates to target several incumbent aldermen. The campaign was successful, resulting in a 15-member progressive majority on the Board of Aldermen. Green later told the St. Louis Post-Dispatch that the "city electorate is a lot more progressive than people have thought recently." Green herself was re-elected to a two-year term in 2021. In an election using approval voting, Green won a rematch against Jennifer Florida in both the primary and the general.

As of June 2022, Green was the chair of the Education and Youth Matters Committee and also sat on the Health and Human Services and Convention, Tourism, Arts, and Humanities committees.

Green briefly ran for a fourth full term as alderwoman in the newly drawn 6th ward, which covers much of the former 15th ward. The election was set for March 2023, but Green dropped out in June 2022 to run for board president. She vacated her 15th ward seat upon being elected board president in November 2022.

Missouri Senate campaign
In October 2019, Green announced her campaign for the Missouri Senate. She ran in the Senate's fifth district, which is entirely within the City of St. Louis. The 2020 Democratic primary in this district was expected to be competitive as incumbent state senator Jamilah Nasheed could not run due to term limits.

Green received endorsements from U.S. Senator Bernie Sanders and the Democratic Socialists of America. On August 4, 2020, she came in second place, losing to state representative Steve Roberts by less than one thousand votes.

President of the St. Louis Board of Alderman

Campaigns

2019
Green announced in December 2017 that she would challenge Lewis Reed in the 2019 Board President election, further straining a political relationship that the Riverfront Times described as a "dumpster fire." She ultimately placed third in the March 2019 Democratic primary, behind Reed and state senator Jamilah Nasheed.

Green was fined in January 2020, by the Missouri Ethic Commission (MEC), for failing to report all campaign contributions.  She had received in-kind donations, in the form of below market rent from a corporate donor. She claimed it was a clerical error.

2022
In May 2022, Reed was indicted on federal bribery charges. On June 5, Green called for Reed to "resign immediately," saying that he had "forfeited the trust" of the city. Reed ultimately resigned on June 7 and Green announced her candidacy to replace him the following week.

Green was endorsed by St. Louis Mayor Tishaura Jones, U.S. Representative Cori Bush, the St. Louis American, and the Democratic Socialists of America. The only other candidate to file was Alderman Jack Coatar, a moderate Democrat whose ward was unsuccessfully targeted by Green's 2021 "Flip the Board" campaign. In the non-partisan blanket primary on September 13, 2022, Green received 54% of the vote to Coatar's 46%. Since there were only two candidates, both Green and Coatar advanced to the general election in November. On November 8, 2022, Green defeated Coatar with 54.9% of the vote to his 44.5%. She is the first woman to be elected board president. Green will serve the remainder of Lewis Reed's four-year term, due to expire in April 2023.

2023
Green officially announced her re-election campaign in December 2022. Despite speculation that Alderwoman Sharon Tyus (1st ward) would mount a challenge, Tyus opted to run in the 12th ward and Green is running unopposed, assuring her a full first term that will expire in April 2027.

Tenure
Green was sworn in as President of Board on November 18, 2022; her inauguration ceremony was held on November 28. Considered a close political ally of Mayor Tishaura Jones, Green has stated that her initial priorities as President are allocating pandemic aid funds, expanding social services, and overseeing the reduction of the Board of Aldermen from 28 to 14 members.

In February 2023, the Board of Aldermen rejected a plan from President Green that would have re-allocated city funds among the wards based on perceived need rather than the current practice of equal distribution.

Electoral history

2014

2015

2017

2019

2020

2021

2022

2023

References

1983 births
Living people
Members of the St. Louis Board of Aldermen
Missouri Democrats
Democratic Socialists of America politicians from Missouri
Pennsylvania State University alumni
Saint Louis University alumni
Washington University in St. Louis faculty